John R. McConathy (April 9, 1930 – April 19, 2016) was an American professional basketball player and educator, originally from Bienville Parish in North Louisiana. McConathy was selected in the 1951 NBA Draft by the Syracuse Nationals after a collegiate career at Northwestern State in Natchitoches, Louisiana, in which he was an All-American player. He played for the Milwaukee Hawks in 1951–52 and averaged 1.3 points, 1.8 rebounds and 0.7 assists per contest in 11 games.

Background

McConathy was born in rural Sailes near Gibsland in Bienville Parish.

Over the years, he maintained a farm in Sailes.

Career

After graduation from Northwestern State University and his brief professional basketball career, McConathy was employed  by the Bienville Parish School Board at Gibsland and Ringgold and then the Bossier Parish School Board. His Bossier High School basketball team won a state championship in 1960. He was the Bossier superintendent from 1972 to 1983. In this capacity, he was a driving force behind the establishment of Bossier Parish Community College, at which his oldest son, Mike McConathy, was the basketball coach from 1983 to 1999. Mike McConathy then became basketball coach at Northwestern State University, a position which he still fills.

After he retired as school superintendent, McConathy worked for two decades as an agent for the New York Life Insurance Company. He was a founding member of Citizens National Bank, of which he was a former board chairman for twenty-five years and remained a bank director at the time of his death.

Family

McConathy was married to the former Corene Floyd (born March 1933). There are four McConathy children: coach Mike McConathy and wife Connie, of Natchitoches, Bill McConathy and wife Anne, of Haughton in south Bossier Parish, Pat McConathy and wife Suanne, of Bossier City, and Melinda McConathy Guest and husband Greg, of Bossier City, and eleven grandchildren. McConathy was an active member of the First Baptist Church of Bossier City. McConathy died in his sleep at the age of eighty-six. Pastors Brad Jurkovich of First Baptist and Justin Haigler of The Simple Church officiated on April 23 at his funeral at First Baptist Bossier. Former pastor Fred L. Lowery officiated thereafter graveside at Williamson Cemetery in Sailes, at which his parents are also interred.

References

External links
Forgotten Legends: John McConathy

1930 births
2016 deaths
American men's basketball players
School superintendents in Louisiana
Baptists from Louisiana
Basketball players from Louisiana
College men's track and field athletes in the United States
Forwards (basketball)
High school basketball coaches in the United States
Insurance agents
Louisiana Democrats
Milwaukee Hawks players
Northwestern State Demons basketball players
People from Bienville Parish, Louisiana
Sportspeople from Bossier City, Louisiana
Syracuse Nationals draft picks
20th-century Baptists